Željko Milošević (Serbian Cyrillic: Жељко Милошевић; born 25 January 1976) is a Serbian football manager and former player.

Honours
Budućnost Banatski Dvor
 Serbia and Montenegro Cup: Runner-up 2003–04

External links
 Utakmica profile
 

Association football defenders
Expatriate footballers in Bosnia and Herzegovina
First League of Serbia and Montenegro players
FK Banat Zrenjanin players
FK Budućnost Banatski Dvor players
FK Laktaši players
FK Obilić players
FK Radnički 1923 players
FK Srem players
Sportspeople from Sremska Mitrovica
Serbian expatriate footballers
Serbian football managers
Serbian footballers
Serbian SuperLiga players
1976 births
Living people